Logosit (1422) was a Serbian nobleman who served Despot Stefan Lazarević (r. 1402–27), with the title of vojvoda (general). He was mentioned in 1422 as fighting in Kotor during the Second Scutari War (1419–26); he commanded a Serbian force that carried out a second attack on Venetian-held Kotor. The surroundings were said to have been devastated by him.

References
 

15th-century Serbian nobility
People of the Serbian Despotate
Medieval Serbian military leaders
15th-century deaths
15th-century soldiers